Sir William Bowes (6 January 1657 – 16 January 1707) was a British landowner and M.P.

Sir William Bowes Kt. of Streatlam Castle was educated at Trinity College, Cambridge. He was one of the two Members of Parliament for County Durham during the second, third and fourth Parliaments of Charles II, and then again in the second Parliament of William III and first and second Parliaments of Queen Anne. His son George Bowes, later represented the County. Sir William married Elizabeth Blakiston of Gibside on 17 August 1691. She was the daughter of Sir Francis Blakiston and Ann Bowes who was  the  great granddaughter of Sir George Bowes of Bradley Hall. From this marriage came much of the wealth of the Bowes (later Bowes-Lyon) family as the Gibside estates lay over rich coal seams. The children of Sir William and Lady Bowes were William Blakiston, Thomas (d. 1722), George, Anne, Elizabeth, Jane and Margaret.  George's daughter (Sir William's granddaughter) was Mary Eleanor Bowes (1745–1800) – in her day considered to be the "wealthiest woman in Europe".

References

1657 births
1707 deaths
English landowners
Alumni of Trinity College, Cambridge
English MPs 1680–1681
English MPs 1681
English MPs 1695–1698
English MPs 1702–1705
English MPs 1705–1707